Erling Lae (born 16 March 1947) is a Norwegian politician for the Conservative Party.

He was born in Oslo, is a cand.philol. by education and formerly worked as a journalist. From 1981 to 1985 he was a political advisor in the Ministry of Consumer Affairs and Administration. He was elected to Oslo city council in 1991, and was a city commissioner between 1997 and 2000. From 2000 to 2009 he was the governing mayor of Oslo. As such he headed the executive branch of the city government in the capital city of Norway.

He was a deputy leader of the Conservative Party from 2008 to 2010. In 2010 he was announced as the new county governor of Vestfold, succeeding Mona Røkke. He was succeeded in June 2016 by second deputy leader of the Progress Party, Per Arne Olsen.

Lae is openly gay, and was named as the most powerful homosexual man in Norway three years in a row by queer website Gaysir, in 2006 through 2008. He is married to Jens Torstein Olsen, a Lutheran minister, with whom he had lived with for 26 years before same-sex marriage was legalized in Norway in 2009.
In June later that year, Lae and his husband travelled to Vilnius, Lithuania to protest after Vilnius Mayor  condemned gay pride parades in the city centre, along with the government of Lithuania passing a law banning "homosexual advertising".

References

1947 births
Living people
Norwegian journalists
Conservative Party (Norway) politicians
Politicians from Oslo
County governors of Norway
Gay politicians
Norwegian LGBT politicians
LGBT conservatism